Orak may refer to:

 A fictional computer in Rogue Planet, a Dan Dare story
 One of the Rabbit Islands
 An islet in Kayangel atoll

See also
 Orak Island (disambiguation)
 Orac (disambiguation)